Augustus Brandegee (July 12, 1828 – November 10, 1904) was an American lawyer and politician who served in the United States House of Representatives from Connecticut.

Early life
Brandegee was born in New London, Connecticut. He was the son of John Brandegee and Mary Ann Deshon Brandegee.  His father was from a Connecticut family, and relocated to New Orleans cotton broker; he later returned to New London and became active in the whaling industry and other business ventures. Brandegee was educated at Union Academy in New London and Hopkins Grammar School in New Haven.

In 1845 Brandegee entered Yale University, where he was elected membership to Delta Kappa Epsilon and Skull and Bones. He graduated in 1849, and then began studying at Yale Law School.  Brandegee completed his legal studies in the office of Andrew C. Lippitt in 1850, was admitted to the bar in 1851, and began to practice in partnership with Lippitt.

Brandegee was elected to the Connecticut House of Representatives in 1854. Although a young member of the House, he was selected as a member of the important judiciary committee. He was also chairman of the select committee to manage the "bill for the defense of liberty," which was aimed at preventing the enforcement of the Fugitive Slave Law in Connecticut. Later, Brandegee chaired the committee which oversaw passage of Connecticut's version of the Maine liquor law, which prohibited the sale of alcoholic beverages.

From 1857 to 1859, Brandegee served as Judge of New London's city court. During this time he became a popular speaker in favor of abolishing slavery, and he delivered speeches at locations throughout Connecticut. In 1860, he was chosen as one of Connecticut's electoral college members, on the Republican ticket headed by former Governor Roger Sherman Baldwin; Abraham Lincoln carried Connecticut, and the electors cast their ballots for Lincoln for president and Hannibal Hamlin for vice president.

Brandegee was again elected to the Connecticut House as a Republican in 1858. He was reelected in 1859, but declined the office because of the death of his father. The following year he was elected to the House again, this time being chosen as Speaker of the House. During this first "War" session of the House, Brandegee managed to keep favor with both Democrats and Republicans. At the end of the year, fellow Bonesman and the leader of the Democrats in the House, Henry C. Deming presented him with a silver service as a token of appreciation for his impartiality.

At the start of the Civil War, Brandegee was active in supporting the Union cause. He traveled all over Connecticut addressing meetings, raising troops and arousing public sentiment.

United States House of Representatives
In 1862 he was elected to Congress from the 3rd district of Connecticut. Although the youngest member of the House, he was selected as a member of the House Committee on Naval Affairs, and later the Military Affairs Committee. Brandegee was also on the Committee on Naval Accounts, and Chairman of a Special Committee on constructing a post office and military route from New York City to Washington, D.C.

Respected as an ardent abolitionist as well as a friend of President Abraham Lincoln, he and a fellow Representative, Democrat James E. English of New Haven voted in favor of the momentous 13th Amendment in 1864 that outlawed slavery; Steven Spielberg's 2012 film Lincoln erroneously depicts them as two Connecticut Democrats with fictional names voting against the amendment.

Also in 1864, Brandegee was a member of the Connecticut delegation to the National Republican Convention in Baltimore, which re-nominated President Lincoln, and nominated Andrew Johnson for the Vice Presidency. Brandegee continued in Congress throughout the Reconstruction Era. In 1866 he attended the National Union Convention at Philadelphia. He did not stand for reelection to Congress in 1866, and his term expired in March 1867.

Post Civil War
In 1871, Brandegee was nominated for the office of Mayor of New London. He won and served a single two-year term. He was Chairman of the Connecticut delegation to the Republican National Conventions of 1880 and 1884.

In 1892 he was a founding partner of Noyes & Brandegee, which was one of the leading law firms in New London. After his service as Mayor his fellow Republicans had tried to convince him to run for Governor or Senator, but Brandegee declined any further elected offices, although he served as Corporation Counsel of New London in 1897 and 1898.

Brandegee died in New London on November 10, 1904, and was buried at Cedar Grove Cemetery in New London.

Legacy
At a special meeting of the superior court on December 31, 1904, Judge George D. Stanton said of Brandegee:

Family
Brandegee was the husband of Nancy Christine Bosworth (1840–1881).  They were the parents of Augustus (1857–1881), Helen (1858–1915), Frank (1864–1924), and Marian (1866–1884).

Brandegee's son Frank also served as a Member of the United States House of Representatives, and was a longtime member of the United States Senate.

References

External resources

Augustus Brandegee at Find A Grave 

1828 births
1904 deaths
Hopkins School alumni
Connecticut lawyers
American abolitionists
Connecticut state court judges
Speakers of the Connecticut House of Representatives
People of Connecticut in the American Civil War
Mayors of New London, Connecticut
Republican Party members of the United States House of Representatives from Connecticut
Yale Law School alumni
19th-century American politicians
19th-century American judges